Abeba Haile (born August 2, 1970) is a prominent Eritrean singer. She has produced albums in the Tigrinya language, she was also in the Eritrean people liberation front which is a military organization that liberated the country from Ethiopian colonialism. Abeba Haile joined the organization when she was young underage , she can play different musical instruments like traditional kirar and also piano , base guitar and guitar. Abeba has been a very effective singer especially she was one of these who contributed at the time of war with Ethiopia in 1998-2001.

Discography
Albums
 Vol. 1 Greatest Hits 1996
 Vol. 2 Me’quei’rsey 2001
 Vol. 3 Natey 2004
 Vol. 4 Africa 2007
 Vol. 5 Instrumental 2011
 Vol. 6 Ezis Men Yirekbo 2017

Single Hit Releases
 Amanido
 Ayenay Yhaysh
 Bahri
 Eirab
 Gahdi dyu
 Hadas ertra
 hade libi

Co-productions
The Melody of Nejem (Volume 1)

References

20th-century Eritrean women singers
Living people
1970 births
21st-century Eritrean women singers